Frans Kuyper (Latin: Cuperus) (1629, Amsterdam — 21 October 1691, Rotterdam) was a Dutch Socinian writer and printer.

Life
First a Remonstrant minister at Vlaardingen, he left the church on his objection to infant baptism. From 1663–1673 he opened a publishing house in Amsterdam and Rotterdam producing Socinian works, including 1665–1668 (with supplement 1692) the Biblioteca fratrum Polonorum. In 1676 he published against Spinoza's 1670 treatise on historical criticism of the Scriptures.

Kuyper played a leading part in the liberal movement of the Mennonites named the "Collegiants", through which some Socinian ideas entered Mennonitism. Kuyper was one of the most active native Dutch Socinians along with Jan Pietersz Beelthouwer (c.1603–1665), Lancelot van Brederode (c.1583–1668), Johannes Becius (1626–1690), David Willemszoon Redoch (c.1633–1680), Jan Cornelisz Knol (d.1672), Adriaan Swartepaard (1641–1691), and Foecke Floris (d.1703). In the period 1660–1664 a dispute in the Mennonite movement over the Socinian sympathies of Galenus Abrahamsz de Haan, lead to a split between "Zonist" and "Lamist" Mennonites. Socinianism briefly resurfaced in the 1740s when the Mennonite minister Johannes Stinstra (1708–1790) was suspended 1742–1757 for advocating tolerance of Socinian views.

Works
 CUPERUS, Franciscus, Arcana atheismi revelata, examine Tractatus Theologico-Politici. Rotterdam. A large part of this work is dedicated to a refutation of the 4th chapter of Spinoza's Tractatus theologico-politicus of 1670

as editor:
 Danielis Breenii (Daniël van Breen) opera theologica ed. by F. Cuperus (Frans Kuyper) 1666
posthumous:
 Johann Wolfgang Jäger – Franciscus Cuperus mala fide aut ad minimum frigide atheismum Spinozae oppugnans 1710

See also
Johannes Bredenburg
Henry More

References

External links
 http://poortman.kb.nl/long2.php?TABEL=T_NAAM&ID=1893

1629 births
1691 deaths
Remonstrants
Dutch Unitarians
Dutch writers
Writers from Amsterdam